The Panasonic Lumix DMC-FZ45 (a.k.a. DMC-FZ40 in North American markets) is a superzoom bridge digital camera, replacing the similar Panasonic Lumix DMC-FZ38 and earlier Panasonic Lumix DMC-FZ28. The Panasonic Lumix DMC-FZ40/FZ45 superzoom slots in where the FZ38/35 left off, featuring the same 25-600mm equiv. lens as the FZ100, but with a 14.1MP CCD sensor and simpler 230K dot 3.0 inch fixed LCD (as opposed to the FZ100's CMOS sensor and high-res screen). The FZ40 also offers AVCHD Lite 720p HD video recording, manual shooting modes and the company’s Sonic Speed auto-focus system that offers the industry's fastest focus times.

External links 
Specs on panasonic.it
Information regarding DMC-FZ45: https://www.dpreview.com/products/panasonic/compacts/panasonic_dmcfz40

Bridge digital cameras
Superzoom cameras
FZ45